The Malaysian National Cycling Federation is the national governing body of cycle racing in Malaysia.

It is a member of the UCI and the Asian Cycling Confederation.

The Committee has announced a total of 49 cycling racing tournaments scheduled to take place nationwide for the year 2021 including 11 tournaments offering UCI points involving the discipline of highway, track, BMX and MTB extreme cycling events.

References

External links

Tour de Langkawi Official Website
Jelajah Malaysia Official Website
 Berita Basikal - Tag Archive - PenyuSukan.com

National members of the Asian Cycling Confederation
Cycle racing organizations
Cycling
Cycle racing in Malaysia
Cycling in Malaysia